Avarua School or Apii Avarua is a co-educational primary school in Avarua, Rarotonga in the Cook Islands. It is the largest primary school in the Cook Islands, with a roll of 505 in 2019.  

The school was founded by the London Missionary Society in 1916, becoming the third school on Rarotonga. From 1926 it was also used a teachers' training college. In October 2016 it celebrated its centenary.

References

Schools in the Cook Islands
Avarua
Educational institutions established in 1916
1910s establishments in the Cook Islands